Wangqing County (현) is a county of southeastern Jilin province, China. It is under the administration of the Yanbian Korean Autonomous Prefecture. The county's name Wangqing comes from the Manchu language meaning fortress.

Administrative divisions

Wangqing has eight towns and one township.

Towns:
Wangqing (汪清镇 / 왕청진), Daxinggou (大兴沟镇 / 대흥구진), Tianqiaoling (天桥岭镇 / 천교령진), Luozigou (罗子沟镇 / 라자구진), Chunyang (春阳镇 / 춘양진), Fuxing (复兴镇 / 복흥진), Baicaogou (百草沟镇 / 백초구진), Dongguang (东光镇 / 동광진)

The only township is Jiguan Township (鸡冠乡 / 계관향)

Climate

Notable people from Wangqing County
 Ju To-il, Chinese-born North Korean vice-marshal

References

External links 

County-level divisions of Jilin
Yanbian Korean Autonomous Prefecture